Qods League (provinces) was a nine team football competition that existed in Iran for four years from 1985 to 1988. In 1989, the league became a competition between clubs rather than provinces.

Teams
The 9 teams were:
Tehran A
Tehran B
Esfehan
Gilan
Mazandaran
Khorasan
Fars
East Azerbaijan
Khuzestan

Titles

1985
This tournament was won by Tehran A.

1986

This tournament was won by Esfehan.

1987

This tournament was won by Esfehan.

1988

This tournament was won by Tehran A.

See also
 Qods League

References

Defunct football leagues in Iran
1985–86 in Iranian football
1986–87 in Iranian football
1987–88 in Iranian football
1988–89 in Iranian football